Simona Frapporti (born 14 July 1988) is an Italian former racing cyclist, who rode professionally between 2008 and 2021, for seven different teams. She competed in the 2013 UCI women's team time trial in Florence. Frapporti is an athlete of Gruppo Sportivo Fiamme Azzurre.

Major results

Track

2007
 National Track Championships
2nd Team sprint
2nd Sprint
2011
 National Track Championships
1st  Team pursuit
2nd Individual pursuit
2012
 2nd Omnium, National Track Championships
2013
 National Track Championships
1st  Team sprint
2nd 500m time trial
2nd Keirin
 3rd Omnium, Copa Internacional de Pista
2014
 National Track Championships
1st  500m time trial
1st  Omnium
 1st Omnium, 6 Giorni delle Rose
 1st Omnium, International Track Women & Men
 2nd Omnium, UIV Talents Cup Final
 3rd  Team pursuit, UEC European Track Championships (with Beatrice Bartelloni, Elena Cecchini, Tatiana Guderzo and Silvia Valsecchi)
2015
 1st Points race, 3 Jours d'Aigle
 2nd Omnium, Fenioux Piste International
 2nd Omnium, Trofeu CAR Anadia Portugal
 3rd Scratch, Irish International Track GP
 3rd Omnium, Internationale Radsport Meeting
2016
 1st  Team pursuit, UEC European Track Championships
 3 Jours d'Aigle
1st Points race
2nd Scratch
2nd Individual pursuit
 National Track Championships
1st  Scratch
1st  Omnium
1st  Individual pursuit
2nd Points race
 2nd  Team pursuit, 2016–17 UCI Track Cycling World Cup, Glasgow
 3rd Omnium, Revolution Champions League
2017
 2nd  Team pursuit, 2017–18 UCI Track Cycling World Cup, Santiago
2018
 2nd  Team pursuit, 2017–18 UCI Track Cycling World Cup, Minsk
 Team pursuit, 2018–19 UCI Track Cycling World Cup
2nd  Milton
3rd  London
 3rd  Team pursuit, UCI Track Cycling World Championships
2019
 3rd Team pursuit, 2019–20 UCI Track Cycling World Cup, Glasgow

Road

2009
 8th GP Liberazione
2010
 2nd SwissEver GP Cham-Hagendorn
2011
 8th GP Liberazione
 8th GP Comune di Cornaredo
2012
 1st Stage 4 La Route de France
 2nd Classica Citta di Padova
 5th GP Liberazione
 7th Omloop van het Hageland
 10th GP Comune di Cornaredo
2014
 3rd  Team time trial, UCI Road World Championships
 9th La Course by Le Tour de France
2015
 6th Overall The Women's Tour
 7th Novilon EDR Cup
 9th Grand Prix de Dottignies
2017
 4th Overall Tour of Zhoushan Island
2018
 4th Overall Panorama Guizhou International Women's Road Cycling Race
 8th Overall Tour of Zhoushan Island
2020
 1st Stage 4 Women's Tour Down Under

See also
2014 Astana BePink Womens Team season

References

External links
 
 

1988 births
Living people
Italian female cyclists
Italian track cyclists
Cyclists from the Province of Brescia
Olympic cyclists of Italy
Cyclists at the 2016 Summer Olympics
Cyclists of Fiamme Azzurre